Spider-Man, also known as Spider-Man: The Animated Series (Spider-Man TAS for short), is an American superhero animated television series based on the Marvel Comics superhero of the same name. The series aired on the Fox Kids Network from November 19, 1994, to January 31, 1998, for a total of five seasons comprising sixty-five episodes, and ran reruns on Toon Disney's Jetix block and on Disney XD. The series was produced by Marvel Films Animation and animated by Tokyo Movie Shinsha.

Synopsis
The series follows Peter Parker, a college student at Empire State University who struggles to balance his responsibilities as the hero Spider-Man with the problems of his personal life. Parker must navigate his romantic affections for love interests Felicia Hardy and Mary Jane Watson, maintain his friendship with Harry Osborn, focus on his academic performance as Dr. Curt Connors' student, and help to support his Aunt May after the death of his Uncle Ben by working as a freelance photographer for the Daily Bugle. The Bugle is owned by loudmouth publisher J. Jonah Jameson, who often uses Parker's pictures of his alter-ego to discredit and carry out a smear campaign against Spider-Man. Parker's peers at ESU include football star Flash Thompson, popular barista Liz Allan, scientific genius Debra Whitman, and research rival Michael Morbius.

As Spider-Man, Parker faces various supervillains that threaten New York City, including criminal masterminds such as the Kingpin and the Hobgoblin, scientific mishaps like Doctor Octopus and the Green Goblin, and the alien symbiotes Venom and Carnage. Spider-Man is occasionally aided in his fight against crime by other superheroes, including the X-Men, the Punisher, Blade, Doctor Strange, Daredevil, Iron Man, Captain America, and the Fantastic Four.

Adaptations
A large number of storylines and events from the comics are loosely adapted in the series, such as:

Season 1
 The first episode, "Night of the Lizard", is loosely based on the comic story "Face-to-Face with... the Lizard!" from The Amazing Spider-Man #6 (November 1963).
 The episode "The Spider Slayer" is loosely based on the comic story "Captured by J. Jonah Jameson!" from The Amazing Spider-Man #25 (June 1965), with the subplot of Flash Thompson dressing up as Spider-Man to scare Peter Parker being taken from "Marked for Destruction by Dr. Doom!" from The Amazing Spider-Man #5 (October 1963).
 The episode "Return of the Spider Slayer" borrows elements from the comic books including the way Alistair Smythe treated Spider-Man and Jameson in a very similar way to how his father Spencer Smythe treated them in the comic story "24 Hours till Doomsday!" in The Amazing Spider-Man #192 (May 1979), the three spider slayers are from "Invasion of the Spider Slayers Part 5: Arachnophobia Too!" from The Amazing Spider-Man #372 (January 1993) and Mary Jane uses her famous line from her first comic appearance: "Face it, Tiger. You just hit the jackpot", in the comic story "The Birth of a Super-Hero!" from The Amazing Spider-Man #42 (November 1966).
 The episode "Doctor Octopus: Armed and Dangerous" is loosely based on the comic story "Spider-Man Versus Doctor Octopus" from The Amazing Spider-Man #3 (July 1963).
 The episode "The Menace of Mysterio" is loosely based on the comic story "The Menace of... Mysterio!" from The Amazing Spider-Man #13 (June 1964).
 The episode "The Sting of the Scorpion" is based on the comic story "Spidey Strikes Back!"/"The Coming of the Scorpion! OR: Spidey Battles Scorpey!" in The Amazing Spider-Man #19-20 (December 1964-January 1965).
 The episode "Kraven the Hunter" is loosely adapted from the comic story of the same name from The Amazing Spider-Man #15.
 The dream sequence from the episode "The Alien Costume, Part One" where the symbiote and the Spider-Man costume fight over Peter Parker is adapted from the comic story "The Sinister Secret of Spider-Man's New Costume!" from The Amazing Spider-Man #258 (November 1984).
 The end of the episode "The Alien Costume, Part Two" where Spider-Man uses the bell to get free from the symbiote is adapted from the comic story "'Til Death Do Us Part!" from Web of Spider-Man #1 (April 1985).
 The beginning of the episode "The Alien Costume, Part Three" where Eddie Brock has a wall covered with newspaper clippings of Spider-Man and turns into Venom swearing vengeance on Spider-Man is adapted from the comic story "Chance Encounter" from The Amazing Spider-Man #298 (March 1988), while the scene where Eddie menaces Peter at Aunt May's home is adapted from the story "The Sand and the Fury" from The Amazing Spider-Man #317 (July 1989).
 "The Hobgoblin" two-parter is loosely adapted from the comic stories "Secrets!"/"Confessions!"/"Endings!" from The Amazing Spider-Man #249-251 (February–April 1984).
 The episode "Day of the Chameleon" is loosely adapted from the comic story "Spider-Man Vs. the Chameleon!" from The Amazing Spider-Man #1 (March 1963).

Season 2
 The episode "The Insidious Six" "and "Battle of the Insidious Six" are both based on the comic story "The Sinister Six!" from The Amazing Spider-Man Annual #1 (October 1964).
 In "Battle of the Insidious Six" the scene where Peter is unmasked by the Insidious Six, after Aunt May is kidnapped by them (but he manages to convince them that he is a fraud) is from the comic story "Unmasked By Doctor Octopus!" from Amazing Spider-Man #12 (May 1964) but instead of Aunt May, it's Betty Brant who is kidnapped by Doctor Octopus by himself. 
 The episode "Hydro-Man" is based on the comic story "The Coming of Hydroman!" from The Amazing Spider-Man #212 (January 1981).
 The episodes "The Mutant Agenda" and "Mutants' Revenge" are based on Spider-Man: The Mutant Agenda #1-3 (March–May 1994).
 The episodes "Morbius" and "Enter the Punisher" are both based on the comic stories "The Spider or the Man?"/"A Monster Called Morbius!"/"Vampire at Large!" from The Amazing Spider-Man #100-102 (September–November 1971). The Man-Spider plot is loosely adapted from "Fast Descent into Hell!"/"To Sacrifice My Soul..." from Marvel Fanfare #1-2 (March 1982 and May 1982).
 "Enter the Punisher" is also based on the comic story "The Punisher Strikes Twice!" from The Amazing Spider-Man #129 (February 1974).
 The episode "Tablet of Time" is based on the comic story "The Web Closes!" from The Amazing Spider-Man #73 (June 1969) with Smythe's robot originating from "Invasion of the Spider Slayers Part 4: One Clue Over The Cuckoo's Nest" from The Amazing Spider-Man #371 (December 1992).
 The episode "Ravages of Time" is based on the comic stories "If This Be Bedlam!"/"Death Without Warning!" from The Amazing Spider-Man #74-75 (July- August 1969) and "Lifetheft Part One: The Wings of Age"/"Lifetheft Part Two: The Thief of Years"/"Lifetheft Part Three: The Sadness of Truth" from The Amazing Spider-Man #386-388 (February–April 1994).
 The episode "Shriek of the Vulture" is based on the comic stories "Duel to the Death with the Vulture!" from The Amazing Spider-Man #2 (May 1963) and "The Wings of Age!" from The Amazing Spider-Man #386 (February 1994).
 The episode "The Final Nightmare" is loosely based on "The Thief of Years" from The Amazing Spider-Man #387 (March 1994).

Season 3
 The episode "Make a Wish" is based on the comic stories "Doc Ock Wins!" from The Amazing Spider-Man #55 (December 1967) and "The Kid Who Collects Spider-Man!" from The Amazing Spider-Man #248 (January 1984). A flashback to Spider-Man's origin is shown and is adapted from the comic story "Spider-Man!" from Amazing Fantasy #15.
 The episode "Attack of the Octobot" is based on the comic stories "Disaster!" from The Amazing Spider-Man #56 (January 1968) and "The Kid Who Collects Spider-Man!" from The Amazing Spider-Man #248 (January 1984).
 The episode "Rocket Racer" is based on the comic stories "The Fiend from the Fire!" from Amazing Spider-Man #172 (September 1977) and "The Rocket Racer's Back in Town!"/"...And Where the Big Wheel Stops, Nobody Knows!" from The Amazing Spider-Man #182-183 (July–August 1978).
 The episode "The Ultimate Slayer" is loosely based on the comic story "Invasion of the Spider Slayers Part 6: The Bedlam Perspective" from The Amazing Spider-Man #373 (January 1993).
 The episode "Tombstone" is loosely based on the comic stories "Grave Memory" from The Spectacular Spider-Man #139 and "Will!" from The Spectacular Spider-Man #142.
 The episode "Venom Returns" is blended from several different comics including "Hearts and Powers"/"Gun From the Heart" from The Amazing Spider-Man #344-345 (February–March 1991) and "Toy Death!" from The Amazing Spider-Man #359 (February 1992).
 The episode "Carnage" is loosely based on the comic stories "Savage Genesis"/"Savage Alliance"/"Savage Grace!" from "The Amazing Spider-Man" #361-363 (April–June 1992).
 The episode "The Spot" is based on the comic story "True Confessions!"/"Spider on the Spot!" from Peter Parker, the Spectacular Spider-Man #98-99 (January–February 1985).
 The episode "Goblin War!" is based on the comic story "The Goblin War" from The Amazing Spider-Man #312 (February 1989).
 The episode "Turning Point" is based on the comic stories "How Green Was My Goblin!" from The Amazing Spider-Man #39 (August 1966) and "The Night Gwen Stacy Died"/"The Goblin's Last Stand!" from The Amazing Spider-Man #121-122 (June–July 1973).

Season 4
 The episode "Guilty" is based on "Guilty!"/"Lock-Up" from The Spectacular Spider-Man #150-151 (May–June 1989) and "Crash Out!" from The Spectacular Spider-Man #155 (October 1989).
 The episode "The Black Cat" is based on "Never Let the Black Cat Cross Your Path!" from The Amazing Spider-Man #194 (July 1979).
 The episode "The Return of the Green Goblin" is based on "The Green Goblin Lives Again!"/"The Green Goblin Strikes!" from The Amazing Spider-Man #136-137 (September–October 1974).

Season 5
 The episode "The Wedding" is loosely based on "The Wedding" from The Amazing Spider-Man Annual #21 (September 1987).
 The "Six Forgotten Warriors" saga is loosely based on "The Parents of Peter Parker!" from The Amazing Spider-Man Annual #5 (November 1968) and "The Assassin-Nation Plot" storyline from The Amazing Spider-Man #320-325 (September 1989–November 1989).
 The "Secret Wars" trilogy adapts the 1984 limited series Marvel Superheroes Secret Wars (May 1984–April 1985).
 The "Spider Wars" duology adapts the second Clone Saga (October 1994–December 1996).

Episodes

Cast and characters

Main voice cast
 Christopher Daniel Barnes – Peter Parker / Spider-Man
 Ed Asner – J. Jonah Jameson
 Jennifer Hale – Felicia Hardy / Black Cat
 Saratoga Ballantine – Mary Jane Watson
 Rodney Saulsberry – Joseph "Robbie" Robertson
 Linda Gary – May Parker (season 1-3)
 Julie Bennett – May Parker (season 4-5)
 Joseph Campanella – Dr. Curt Connors / Lizard
 Gary Imhoff – Harry Osborn / Green Goblin
 Neil Ross – Norman Osborn / Green Goblin
 Roscoe Lee Browne – Wilson Fisk / Kingpin
 Efrem Zimbalist Jr. – Dr. Otto Octavius / Doctor Octopus
 Hank Azaria – Eddie Brock / Venom
 Mark Hamill – Jason Philips / Hobgoblin
 Joan Lee – Madame Web

Production
While Fox Kids' X-Men animated series was being produced by Saban, Spider-Man was produced by the newly formed Marvel Films Animation; it was the only series that in-house studio produced, but was animated by TMS-Kyokuchi Corporation, with their subsidiary Seoul Movie helping their parent company with the show's animation (uncredited). Koko Enterprises Ltd. and Anima Sam Won did additional animation for this series (though they were also uncredited). For many years, the series was the second longest-running Marvel show created, after X-Men, as well as the longest-running series based on Spider-Man (until Ultimate Spider-Man surpassed its record in 2015).

The show was notorious for its censorship. In some episodes, realistic guns were depicted, but only in flashbacks, such as the showing of guns being fired during a flashback about the Punisher's origins where his wife was killed in the crossfire during a crime. Rules for the production of the show included no punching, throwing through glass, putting children in jeopardy or vampires as well as no usage of the word sinister. In November 2014 podcasts, Semper clarified that the show was not censored more than any other show at the time and that every time this has been brought up to him, he feels it has been blown out of proportion; Semper said that Marvel had no creative control on the TV series because Marvel at the time was in a tough time and close to bankruptcy. In addition, Semper stated that Stan Lee had influence on the show in the first thirteen episodes. The series is currently owned and distributed by The Walt Disney Company (Marvel's parent company), which acquired all Fox Kids-related properties from News Corporation and Saban International in 2001.

Writing staff
Producer John Semper was the primary credited writer on the show, receiving some sort of writing credit (usually a story, co-story or co-writing credit) on 60 of the 65 produced episodes. He wrote 8 episodes solo; many of his story credits were actually adaptations of previously published comic book stories.

Mark Hoffmeier was a frequent contributor, receiving credits on 16 episodes, while Stan Berkowitz was credited on 9.

Many of the other series writers had previously worked on Batman: The Animated Series, including Brynne Stephens, Marv Wolfman, Gerry Conway, Marty Isenberg and Robert N. Skir, Len Wein, and Sean Catherine Derek.

Semper watched previous Spider-Man adaptations for inspiration, but he was not impressed by most of them. The only previous adaptation that impressed him was the live-action Japanese Spider-Man (1978), which he thought was a "great" show and "goofy fun." Japanese Spider-Man's giant mecha robot influenced the final multi-part parallel universe arc where Spider-Man's wealthy alter-ego has a robot.

Animation
To reproduce New York City's appearance, background illustrators undertook a large amount of visual research by using photo archives from above New York, particularly rooftops. Maps were consulted for references and buildings were faithfully reproduced.

It has been reported that the animation cels depicting Manhattan's Pan Am Building (recently renamed the MetLife Building) were scrapped after being complete because the California-based art staff learned the Midtown landmark had been given a new sign more than a year earlier.

The animation staff were directed to populate the city with cars and crowds on the street level. Semper believed that was one of the limitations of earlier Spider-Man animated projects.

Originally, Marvel Films planned to make the backgrounds completely CGI while Spider-Man swung around New York, yet due to budget constraints were forced to use traditional cel based animation while occasionally using CGI backgrounds by video game developer Kronos Digital Entertainment. As well, reuse of animation became more common as the series progressed, which also included reuse of animation involving a character speaking (these scenes were sometimes slowed down in order to better match the actor's voice to the animation).

Music
Marvel outsourced the show's music to distributors Saban Entertainment, who were also responsible for the music in the concurrent X-Men cartoon airing on Fox Kids. The theme for the series was performed by Joe Perry of the hard rock band Aerosmith, although the song was written by Shuki Levy. Levy, Haim Saban and Udi Harpaz are credited as composers of the orchestral background score. The music was conducted with a live orchestra in Israel. It was recorded in Israel due to it being less expensive to do it there than in the U.S.

Reception
Spider-Man was both highly acclaimed and commercially successful, receiving wide critical praise for the faithfulness to the source material, the portrayal of many different classic storylines from the comics, the deep focus on the titular hero's personal life, motivations and struggles and the layered character work, along with the presentation of Spider-Man's rogues gallery. It also garnered exceptionally high ratings for a Saturday morning cartoon and shortly after the premiere became the highest rated and most popular children's television show in America.

Cancellation
Producer John Semper Jr. clarified on his Facebook page that the show's cancellation was not due to disagreements between executive producer Avi Arad and network head Margaret Loesch but rather funding issues:

"Fox contracted for 65 episodes and that's exactly what we did. Fox hated Avi almost from day one, so nothing much changed there. It didn't help, but it wasn't the reason we were not picked up for more episodes. New World, who actually produced the show, had gone out of business, so there was nobody to pay for whatever costs Fox wouldn't cover. And most shows rarely even made it to 65 episodes, so the feeling was we were done and that was enough. Spider-Man wasn't 'canceled'. It ran its full course."

Awards
Writer / Producer John Semper Jr. was nominated for an Annie Award in 1995 for Best Individual Achievement for Writing in the Field of Animation for the episode "Day of the Chameleon". Spider-Man was also nominated for one 1996 Image Award for Outstanding Animated/Live-Action/Dramatic Youth or Children's Series/Special.

Merchandising
Three comic book series based on the TV series were produced:
 Spider-Man Adventures (December 1994 to February 1996): the first 13 issues each adapted one episode from the first season, and the last two issues were original stories. Spider-Man Adventures #1–4 was later reprinted in Kellogg's Froot Loops Mini-Comics #1–4.
 The Adventures of Spider-Man (April 1996 to March 1997): featuring new stories based on the series. Adventures of Spider-Man was later reprinted in Spectacular Spider-Man (UK Magazine) #11–21 from August 1996 to May 1997.
 Marvel Adventures (April 1997 to September 1998): anthology featuring various animated versions of Marvel characters—Spider-Man only appeared sporadically.

A number of video games based on the series were also produced:
 Spider-Man Cartoon Maker for the PC
 Spider-Man Animated Series for the Super NES and Genesis

Electronic versions of classic Spider-Man comics were released by Marvel that included narration by Christopher Daniel Barnes and featured animation and theme music from this series. Spider-Man novels inspired by selected episodes were also released. A wide variety of themed merchandise (lunch boxes, cereals, clothing, etc.) was produced. McDonald's produced a themed line of Happy Meal toys for the show. However, this paled in comparison to the extensive official toy line that ran over eight series, and included a staggering amount of play sets and vehicles and actually lasted longer than the television series itself.

Release availability
Despite the fact that the show ended in 1998, the success of the live-action Spider-Man films have sparked more interest in new fans, allowing the series to air in reruns due to its new owners: The Walt Disney Company.

This show had been shown streaming entirety on Disney+ service since November 12, 2019.

This show was temporarily eliminated from Disney+ on April 26, 2021, but soon came back to service on the 2nd of May that same year.

Home media
Region 1

During the series' run, some episodes were released on VHS. These were from 20th Century Fox Home Entertainment.

In the late 1990s, another selection of VHS compilations were released by Marvel Films/New World Entertainment (these tapes were distributed in Canada by Telegenic Entertainment). These releases featured episodes edited into 70–80, 90-100 minute movies based on the particular story arc.

To date, the only VHS and DVD releases of the series in the U.S. have been several volume sets from Buena Vista Home Entertainment that feature 4-5 episodes each.

Region 2

In the UK, Sweden, and Germany, Clear Vision Ltd. has released all five seasons on DVD as of October 19, 2009.

Other releases
 A Canadian DVD containing three episodes from the "Mutant Agenda" episodes. This is a reissue of the 1997 Marvel-New World/Telegenic VHS release (and it was mastered from one of those VHS releases); as a "Bonus" two episodes from the 1990s Iron Man TV series are included, just like on the VHS release. (Please note there are no audio/subtitle selections.)
 Canadians also received another DVD release of the first season two-parter "The Hobgoblin". This was a re-release of a 2002 VHS release by Disney; the video quality of the episodes on the DVD is that of a VHS transfer. There are no bonus features or audio/subtitle selections on this DVD either.
 A VCD release by Magnavision Home Video.
 A boxed set of all the DVDs released in Poland, simply entitled "Spider-Man: 5 DVD Set". The front of the box features the same graphics as "The Ultimate Villain Showdown". DVDs including random assortments of episodes were also distributed with various magazines, ranging from entire story arcs to two or three episodes per DVD.
 Several two-episode DVDs released by Marvel in 2002 prior to the acquisition by Disney.
 3 DVDs with 2 episodes each were released regionally for Serbia and Montenegro, Croatia, Slovenia, Bosnia and Herzegovina and Macedonia with Serbian, Croatian and Slovenian dubs on them in 2005.
 The entire first season is available on Xbox Live and iTunes through Disney XD.
 All five seasons are currently available for digital purchase on Vudu and Amazon.
 The entire series was available on Disney+ but was taken off for some reason. Later on May 2 it made its return to the service. 
 There were also unlicensed DVDs that had The Adventure Continues on them that contained two episodes from most of the movies that were released by Marvel Films/New World Entertainment. For example, one was Spider-Man - Blade the Vampire Hunter which contained two episodes which were "Blade, the Vampire Hunter" and "The Immortal Vampire", a two-part story episode from the second season, making it like a movie based on the toy line, Spider-Man: Vampire Wars.
In France, all episodes were released on DVD from local Editor TF1 video, but only with French tracks voices and no subtitles available.

Bootleg DVDs of the show have become popular among fans due to a lack of official DVD releases. The bootlegs feature all of the episodes but some of them have low video quality and watermarks. This is likely to change as the entire series becomes available in the UK. The series is currently the 9th most wanted unreleased DVD at TVShowsOnDVD.com.

Legacy

Comics
Similarly to X-Men: The Animated Series, the series inspired a number of comic books. The first one was Spider-Man Adventures, published for 15 issues between December 1994 and February 1996, which loosely adapted the plot from the series’ episodes. It was followed by Adventures of Spider-Man, a 12-issues series with original stories, published from April 1996 to March 1997.

Additionally, Marvel published a second series inspired by the animated series titled Spider-Man Magazine, that went on for 19 issues from March 1994 to March 1997. Two special issues were also published in 1995.

Spider-Verse
The last two episodes of Spider-Man: The Animated Series, about multiple Spider-Man characters crossing dimensions to different universes, was the first Spider-Man story involving parallel universes. This inspired the Spider-Verse, which later appeared in various Spider-Man comics, cartoons and films in the early 21st century, with most notably the animated Spider-Verse feature films.

Spiritual successor and possible revival
On November 1, 2014 at the Comikaze Expo, where the show's 20th anniversary was celebrated, John Semper Jr. revealed that much of the cast and crew of Spider-Man, himself included, had agreed to reunite for a new crowdfunded series entitled "War of the Rocket Men". In addition, in late 2014, Semper Jr started a website (cartoonspiderman.com) that features behind-the-scenes content, podcasts about the show, a link to the Facebook page that Semper regularly posts on and more. In April 2016, Semper's YouTube account posted a video in which he revealed that he had written a short story following up on the series, detailing Peter finding Mary Jane with Madame Web's help in a Victorian Age setting, referring to the story as "an autobiographical fan-fiction" in which he reminisced on what it was like writing the last episodes of the series, as well as detailing how Peter and Mary Jane would have been reunited, adding one could think of it as "the lost episode of Spider-Man: The Animated Series". Semper explained that he would be releasing this as a perk on a crowd-funding campaign for War of the Rocket Men. The video also featured the returning voices of Christopher Daniel Barnes and Sara Ballantine as Spider-Man/Peter Parker and Mary Jane Watson respectively in an audio promo prologue entitled "Peter Finds Mary Jane".

After X-Men '97 was announced as a revival of the X-Men TV series by Marvel Studios for the streaming service Disney+, it marked a possibility that Spider-Man could be revived for Disney+ as well. In July 2022, Semper addressed this, stating that he would happily do it if he had the same creative freedom he had on the series:

See also
 Spider-Man Unlimited
 The Spectacular Spider-Man
 Ultimate Spider-Man
 Marvel's Spider-Man

References

Sources
 DRG4's Spider-Man: The Animated Series Page
 Animator John Cawley official site
 Marvel Animation Age Presents: Spider-Man: The Animated Series

External links

 Spider-Man at Fox Kids (Archive)
 
 Spider-Man (1994) at TVShowsOnDVD.com
 Spider-Man at Marvel.com
 Semper Jr's 2014 - Making of Spider-Man Website
 Spider-Man: The Animated Series on Facebook

 
1990s American animated television series
1994 American television series debuts
1998 American television series endings
American children's animated action television series
American children's animated adventure television series
American children's animated drama television series
American children's animated science fantasy television series
American children's animated superhero television series
1994
Animated series produced by Marvel Studios
Animated television series based on Marvel Comics
Anime-influenced Western animated television series
English-language television shows
Fox Broadcasting Company original programming
Fox Kids
Teen animated television series
Teen superhero television series
Television series by Saban Entertainment
Television shows based on Marvel Comics
Television shows set in New York City
Works by Len Wein